Agustín Sebastiá (born 30 August 1964) is a Spanish former cyclist. He competed in the team pursuit event at the 1988 Summer Olympics.

References

External links
 

1964 births
Living people
Spanish male cyclists
Olympic cyclists of Spain
Cyclists at the 1988 Summer Olympics
Sportspeople from Valencia
Cyclists from the Valencian Community